The Canadian National  U-1-a U-1-b  class locomotives were three subclasses of 37 4-8-2 Mountain-type steam locomotives built for the Canadian National Railways between 1923 and 1924 . They were retired between 1951 and 1962 .

Accidents and incidents
On 1 September 1947, locomotive 6001 was involved in the Dugald rail accident. It collided with another CN 4-8-2 numbered 6046.  6001 was later rebuilt by CN.

On 21 November 1950, locomotive 6004, was severely damaged a head-on collision with S-2-a 2-8-2  3538 at Canoe River, British Columbia. It was scrapped in June 1951 (as was the 3538). There was a gap of four years before the next U-1-a or U-1-b went: two were scrapped in 1955, four in 1957, six in 1958, six in 1959, eight in 1960, seven in 1961, and the last two, 6000 and 6001 in 1962.

In art
U-1-a 6004 was the subject of a 1924 publicity poster by C. Norwich. It depicts the locomotive speeding along in the foreground, while in the background is a pine-covered, snow-capped mountain peak. Across the top is the "Canadian National Railways" logotype; across the bottom are the words, "Across Canada", and in the lower left, above the artist name and date is "The Continental Limited in the Canadian Rockies"

Preservation
One locomotive has been preserved:
 CN 6015 (U-1-a) — Retired 1960; to CHRA, Delson, Quebec. On public display in Jasper, Alberta, since July 1972.

References

4-8-2 locomotives
Steam locomotives of Canada
U-1-a
CLC locomotives
Railway locomotives introduced in 1923
Standard gauge locomotives of Canada
Passenger locomotives